Joseph Cullen was an Australian politician.

Joseph Cullen may also refer to:

Joseph W. Cullen, director of the AMC Cancer Research Center, and deputy director of the National Cancer Institute
Joseph Cullen (Australian politician), one of the Members of the New South Wales Legislative Assembly, 1894–1895
Joseph Cullen (footballer) for New Jersey Blaze

See also
Joe Cullen (disambiguation)